Stephen Beyor is an American politician who served in the Vermont House of Representatives from 2012 to 2019.

References

Living people
21st-century American politicians
Members of the Vermont House of Representatives
People from Highgate, Vermont
Year of birth missing (living people)